Harttia torrenticola is a species of armored catfish endemic to Brazil where it is found in the São Francisco River basin.  This species grows to a length of  SL.

References
 

torrenticola
Catfish of South America
Fish of the São Francisco River basin
Endemic fauna of Brazil
Taxa named by Osvaldo Takeshi Oyakawa
Fish described in 1993